Phyllocharis undulata is a species of leaf beetle, native to Southeast Asia. It is found in Laos, Cambodia, Vietnam, Peninsular Malaysia, Singapore, Java, Lombok and Timor.

Description 
Phyllocharis undulata feeds on various species of Clerodendrum (Verbenaceae), including Clerodendrum inerme, Clerodendrum chinense and Clerodendrum calamitosum.

Pest control 
It has been considered as a biological control agent against Clerodendrum chinense, which has become a serious noxious weed and invasive species on some Pacific Islands in the southwestern Pacific Ocean, including Samoa, Niue, and Fiji.

See also 
 Beneficial insects

References 

Chrysomelinae
Beetles of Asia
Insects of China
Insects of Timor
Insects of Laos
Insects of Malaysia
Insects of Cambodia
Insects of Singapore
Insects of Vietnam
Beetles described in 1763
Insects used for control of invasive plants
Biological pest control beetles
Taxa named by Carl Linnaeus